Comment c'est loin is a 2015 French quasi-autobiographical musical comedy-drama film written by French rapper Orelsan and directed by Orelsan and Christophe Offenstein. The film stars Orelsan and fellow French rapper Gringe, both of whom form the rap duo Casseurs Flowters, and is based on their debut studio album Orelsan et Gringe sont les Casseurs Flowters, which was released on 15 November 2013.

The film is set over a 24-hour period in the city of Caen, Normandy, and follows Aurélien, known as Orel (Orelsan, as he was formerly known), and Guillaume, known as Gringe (himself). They seek to finish recording their first song together at the request of their producers Skread (himself) and Ablaye (himself), but struggle to do so as they wander around the town with friends looking for quick ways to make money and a good time.

Comment c'est loin was premiered at the Saint-Jean-de-Luz International Film Festival on 10 October 2015, as well as being shown at the Sarlat Film Festival on 13 November 2015, before being released to the French public on 9 December 2015. The film has received mixed-to-positive reviews from critics, and grossed $1,001,196 in the domestic box office within its first three weeks.

Synopsis
After half a decade of doing next to nothing, Orelsan and Gringe are in their mid-thirties as they struggle to complete their first rap album. Their songs are mostly stories of sex and alcohol, reflecting their everyday lives in the city of Caen. They have never really finished a song and when they meet with their producers, they are faced with a new challenge. Their old issues, the fear of failure, their alcoholic friends and annoying girlfriends serve to stand in their way as they set out to finish their first song within the next 24 hours.

Cast
 Orelsan as Aurélien "Orel" Cotentin (himself)
 Gringe as Guillaume "Gringe" Tranchant (himself)
 Seydou Doucouré as Bouteille
 Claude Urbiztondo-Llarch as Claude (himself)
 Ablaye as Abdoulaye "Ablaye" Doucouré (himself)
 Skread as Matthieu "Skread" Le Carpentier (himself)
 Sophie de Fürst as Pauline
 Chloé Astor as Arielle
 Redouanne Harjane as the fan
 Marc Brunet as Aurélien's father
 Jeannine Cotentin as Aurélien's grandmother (herself)
 Isabelle Alfred as Arielle's mother
 Alain Dion as Arielle's father
 France Hofnung as Marie
 Clément Cotentin as the local radio DJ
 Paul Minthe as the hotel manager
 Marine Forster Bourdin as the schools inspector

Production

Filming

Comment c'est loin was filmed on location in the city of Caen, Lower Normandy, where Orelsan went to college and met record producer Skread, one of the film's other composers. Orelsan announced the beginning of production on his Instagram page on 21 March 2015, posting a picture of a copy of the film's script with the working title Orel et Gringe (Orel and Gringe). He posted another picture on 4 May, this time of himself next to Gringe, presumably during a certain scene in the film, announcing in the caption that filming was complete and confirming the film's title as Comment c'est loin.

Music

The musical score for the film was composed by Alexis Rault, while the soundtrack featured new songs from Casseurs Flowters and produced by Skread. The soundtrack album, which also acts as Casseurs Flowters' second studio album, was released in France along with the film on 9 December 2015. It peaked at number 24 on the French Albums Chart, at number 61 on the Belgian Ultratop Albums Chart (Wallonia) and at number 83 on the Swiss Hitparade Albums Chart. In April 2017, the album was certified platinum in France.

References

External links
 
 
 

2015 films
2015 comedy films
2010s biographical films
French comedy films
French biographical films
2010s French-language films
Film spin-offs
Films about entertainers
Films about families
Films directed by Orelsan
Films set in 2013
Films set in Caen
Films shot in Normandy
2010s French films